

Bangor Cathedral
The 14th century poet Dafydd ap Gwilym wrote of the organ and choir of Bangor Cathedral.

Organists

1644  Thomas Bolton
1689  (A Vicar Choral) ?
1691  Thomas Roberts
1705       ?    Priest
1708       ?    Smith
1710       ?    Ferrer
1713  John Rathbone
1721  Thomas Rathbone
1750  Thomas Lloyd
1778  Richard Jarred
1782  William Shrubsole
1784  Edmund Olive
1793  Joseph Pring
1842  James Sharpe Pring
1868  Robert Roberts
1872  Roland Rogers
1892  T. Westlake Morgan
1906  Roland Rogers (reappointed)
1928  Leslie Douglas Paul
1970  John Hywel
1972  Andrew John Goodwin
2009  Graham Eccles
2014  Martin Brown

Director of Music

2014   Paul Booth
2021   Joe Cooper

Brecon Cathedral
Brecon Cathedral is the cathedral of the Church in Wales Diocese of Swansea and Brecon.

Organists
1923  John Humphrey Carden
1956  David Gwerfyl Davies (formerly organist of The Church of St. Nicholas, Kings Norton)
1963  Michael Bryan Hesford (later organist of St Mary's Church, Melton Mowbray)
1966  David Patrick Gedge
2007  Mark Duthie
2017  Stephen Power

Assistant organists
1968 Hazel Davies
2007 Meirion Wynn Jones
2012 Paul Hayward
2014 Stephen Power
2017 Tom Coxhead
2018 Jonathan Pilgrim

Cardiff Metropolitan Cathedral
Cardiff Metropolitan Cathedral is the cathedral of the Roman Catholic Archdiocese of Cardiff.

Directors of Music and Organists
1974 Hellier Johns
1980 David Neville
2016 Dominic Neville

2017 Jeffrey Howard

Assistant Organists
1974 Nigel Davies
1976 Keith Lowe

Master of the choristers
2016 James Neville

Organ Scholar 
2009-2012 James Wall
2016 - 2017 Joseph Cavalli-Price

Llandaff Cathedral
Llandaff Cathedral has only dedicated choir school in the Church in Wales.

Organists and Masters of the Choristers

1861 John Bernard Wilkes
1866 Francis Edward Gladstone
1870 Theodore Edward Aylward
1876 Charles Lee Williams
1882 Hugh Brooksbank
1894 George Galloway Beale
1937 William Henry Gabb
1946 Albert Vernon Butcher
1949 Thomas Hallford
1950 Eric Arthur Coningsby
1952 Charles Kenneth Turner
1957 Eric Howard Fletcher
1958 Robert Henry Joyce
1974 Michael John Smith
2000 Richard Moorhouse
2014 Jonathan Bielby (interim)
2016 Stephen Moore

Assistant Organists
1894 Arthur Charles Edwards
1940 R. M. Powney
1966–1970 Graham John Elliott (afterwards organist of St Asaph Cathedral)
1970–1980 Anthony Burns-Cox (later organist of Romsey Abbey)
1980–2010 Michael Hoeg M.B.E
2010–2012 James Norrey (afterwards Assistant Director of Music at Newcastle Cathedral)
2012–2013 Sachin Gunga (post dissolved December 2013)

Assistant Director of Music
2021 Aaron Shilson

Newport Cathedral
Newport Cathedral is the cathedral of the Church in Wales Diocese of Monmouth.

Organists
1964−1979 Donald Bate
1979 Christopher Barton
2015 Dr. Emma Gibbins

Assistant organists
2006 Ronny Krippner (later Director of Music at Croydon Minster; currently Director of Music at Ripon Cathedral)
2007 Christopher Denton
2010 Jeremy Blasby

St Asaph Cathedral
In 2018 St Asaph Cathedral made its professional music staff redundant.

Organists

1620 John Day
1630 Abednego D. Perkins
1631 John Wilson
1669 Thomas Ottey
1680 William Key
1686 Thomas Hughes
1694 Alexander Gerard
1738 John Gerard
1782 John Jones
1785 Edward Bailey
1791 Charles Spence
1794 Henry Hayden
1834 Robert Augustus Atkins
1889 Llewellyn Lloyd
1897 Hugh Percy Allen
1898 Archibald Wayet Wilson
1901 Cyril Bradley Rootham
1902 William Edward Belcher
1917 Harold Carpenter Lumb Stocks
1956 Robert Duke Dickinson
1962 James Roland Middleton
1970 Graham John Elliott
1981 John Theodore Belcher
1985 Hugh Davies
1998 Graham Eccles
2004 - 2018 Alan McGuinness 
2018 Christopher Enston
and Director of Music 
2019 
Paul Booth

Assistant organists
1875–1889 Llewelyn Lloyd
1897–1901 F. Walton Evans
1978–1982 Patrick Larley

Assistant Director of Music

2004–2018 John Hosking; later Director of Music at Holy Trinity, Southport (2018 - 2022) then Organist in Residence at Blackburn Cathedral.

St Davids Cathedral
Organists at St Davids Cathedral include the father of the composer Thomas Tomkins.

Organist and Master of the Choristers

1490 Priest Vicars
1509 John Norman
1563 Thomas Elliot
1570–1586 Thomas Tomkins (father of the composer Thomas Tomkins)
1713 R. Mordant
1714 Henry Mordant
1719 Richard Tomkins
1719 Williarn Bishop
1720 Henry Williams
1725 Matthew Maddox
1734 Matthew Philpott
1793 Arthur Richardson
1827 John Barrett
1851 William Peregrine Propert
1883 Frederick Garton
1894 D. John Codner
1896 Herbert C. Morris
1922 Joseph Soar
1953 Peter Boorman
1977 Nicholas Jackson
1984 Malcolm Watts
1990 Kerry Beaumont (later Organist of Ripon Cathedral and Coventry Cathedral)
1995 Geraint Bowen (currently Director of Music at Hereford Cathedral)
2001 Timothy Noon (later Organist of Liverpool Metropolitan Cathedral; currently Organist of Exeter Cathedral)
2007 Alexander Mason (currently Director of Music at Lancing College)
2011 Daniel Cook (later Sub-Organist of Westminster Abbey; currently Organist of Durham Cathedral)
2013 Oliver Waterer (currently Organist of Selby Abbey)

Director of Music
2022 Simon Pearce

Assistant Organist
1991 Michael Slaney 
1998 Simon Pearce

Assistant Director of Music
2022 Laurence John

Organ Scholars
2016 Aaron Shilson (currently Assistant Director of Music at Llandaff Cathedral)
2017 Rupert Jackson (currently music student at Magdalen College, Oxford)
2018 Emily India Evans (subsequently Organ Scholar of Sidney Sussex College, Cambridge)
2019 Joshua Roebuck (now Organist of Westwood United Methodist Church, Los Angeles)
2020 Michael D'Avanzo (subsequently Organ Scholar of Jesus College, Cambridge) 
2021 Thomas Hawkes (Acting Assistant Director of Music)
2022 James Watson

Swansea Cathedral
St Joseph's Cathedral is the cathedral of the Roman Catholic Diocese of Menevia

Diocesan Director of Music
 Paul Brophy

Wrexham Cathedral
The Cathedral of Our Lady of Sorrows is the cathedral of the Roman Catholic Diocese of Wrexham.

Choir director
 Paul Booth

See also
 List of musicians at English cathedrals

Notes

References

Sources
 

Welsh cathedrals, List of musicians at